III (stylized as (III) and also titled Crystal Castles) is the third studio album by Canadian electronic music duo Crystal Castles, released on November 7, 2012 by Fiction Records and Polydor Records. Production was handled by Ethan Kath, with additional production by Jacknife Lee.

III is the last Crystal Castles album with vocalist Alice Glass before her departure in 2014, and is also their last eponymous album, as the band's 2016 album is titled Amnesty (I) instead of (IV) or Crystal Castles. Glass continued the series on her own by including "IV" into the title of her 2022 debut album Prey//IV.

Background and recording
Produced entirely by Ethan Kath, III was recorded in Berlin and Warsaw, and mixed in London. The album addresses the theme of oppression, with the musicians using different pedals and keyboards to create a diverse "palette of sound". "A lot of bad things have happened to people close to me since II and it's profoundly influenced my writing as I've realized there will never be justice for them. I didn't think I could lose faith in humanity any more than I already had, but after witnessing some things, it feels like the world is a dystopia where victims don't get justice and corruption prevails", Alice Glass explained in a statement. On October 9, 2012, the track listing for the album was revealed via the duo's official Facebook page.

Artwork
The album cover features an award-winning photograph by Samuel Aranda. It shows a mother, Fatima al-Qaws embracing her son Zayed who is suffering from the effects of tear gas after taking part in a street demonstration against the then ruling President Ali Abdullah Saleh in Sana'a, Yemen in 2011. The photo was awarded the World Press Photo of the Year 2011 in February, 2012.

Release and promotion
III was released digitally on November 7 in the United States, and the CD was released on November 8 in Australia, Canada, and the United States. The album cover features a picture by Spanish-born Catalan photojournalist and photographer Samuel Aranda. The image depicts a woman named Fatima al-Qaws holding her son, Zayed, who was exposed to tear gas during a street demonstration in Sana'a, Yemen, on October 15, 2011.

The album's first two singles, "Plague" and "Wrath of God", were made available for free download on the duo's SoundCloud page on July 25 and September 26, 2012, respectively. The accompanying music video for "Plague" debuted on September 24, 2012 and uses footage from Andrzej Żuławski's 1981 film Possession. "Affection" was released as the album's third single on October 31, 2012. The music video for "Affection" premiered on April 26, 2013 and was filmed on the duo's South American tour. "Violent Youth" premiered on Zane Lowe's BBC Radio 1 show on November 1, 2012. A music video for "Sad Eyes", shot in Berlin and Toronto, was released on January 20, 2013.

On July 26, 2012, Crystal Castles announced a North American tour with Health and Kontravoid in support of the album, as well as festivals appearances in Europe and Australia, starting on August 9, 2012 and ending on January 28, 2013. In November 2012, the band performed six dates in the United Kingdom. Additional dates across Europe, Oceania, North America, and South America were announced on October 17, 2012 and January 9, 2013. III is the last Crystal Castles album Alice Glass was involved in.

Critical reception

III received generally positive reviews from music critics. At Metacritic, which assigns a weighted mean rating out of 100 to reviews from mainstream critics, the album received an average score of 76, based on 33 reviews, which indicates "generally favorable reviews". Louis Pattison of the NME commented that, "in toning down the shock and awe, [Crystal Castles have] revealed the beating heart at the centre of their work. The message, still, is that the world is a cruel and fucked-up place. But being doomed seldom sounded so beautiful." AllMusic's Heather Phares viewed III as the duo's "most serious set of songs yet" and stated, "Artistic progress is as much about subtraction as it is about addition, and on III, Crystal Castles have made room to be sad, angry, pretty, and danceable at the same time." Pitchforks Ian Cohen dubbed III "the duo's most focused record", adding, "While not as immediately striking as either Crystal Castles (I or II), the streamlined sound allows more maneuverability and subtle variety in the actual songwriting." Matt James of PopMatters wrote, "Perennial outsiders to the death, Crystal Castles' third act is inspiring, warped, feverishly uncomfortable, bold, bloody and brilliant."

Dan Pfleegor of Consequence of Sound opined that "III is less playful than the duo's previous couple of offerings, but its thematic mood is much tighter and more fully realized." The Guardians Tim Jonze noted that "witch house is an obvious influence [on the album], and you could question whether the former chip-tune terrorists are still as ahead of the curve as they once were. It hardly matters when they can come up with stuff like 'Child I Will Hurt You', a dream-state lullaby that is both beautiful and unbearably sorrowful." Simon Price of The Independent stated that the album "shudders and shimmers like some massive, monstrous machine. But, when heard loud, the more accurate metaphors come from nature: flashes of lightning at the top end, earthquakes and landslides at the bottom." In a mixed review, Jesse Cataldo of Slant Magazine described III as "earnest, expansive electronica from a duo few are expecting such sincerity from, and it edges them directly into the middle of the road", concluding, "In striving for something new, the duo has only found a more recognizable sort of tedium." Annie Zaleski of The A.V. Club expressed that, "instead of anarchist dance jams full of crunchy 8-bit noise, (III) is more like a static-filled radio station fading in and out of range." Zaleski continued, "While (III) can use this disorientation effectively [...] too often the music is irritating, not disruptive." Hermione Hoby of The Observer felt that "there's very little on this third LP that could qualify as 'experimental'. Track after track leans heavily on the relentless four-to-the-floor of trance, with Alice Glass's yelped vocals muffled under a weight of sound that's simultaneously boring and abrasive."

Accolades

Commercial performance
The album debuted at No. 145 on Billboard 200, and No. 5 on Top Dance/Electronic Albums for charts dated November 24, 2012, selling 4,000 copies in the first week.  The album reached No. 77 on Billboard 200 the following week, and No. 2 on Dance/Electronic Albums. The album has sold 52,000 copies in the United States as of August 2016.

Track listing

Personnel
Credits adapted from the liner notes of III.

Crystal Castles
 Ethan Kath – production ; mixing 
 Alice Glass – vocals

Additional personnel

 Lexxx – mixing ; vocal recording 
 Alex Bonenfant – vocal recording 
 Jeremy Glover – vocal recording 
 Jacknife Lee – additional production, synth 
 Samuel Aranda – cover photograph
 Brian Gardner – mastering
 Christopher Chartrand – live drums

Charts

Weekly charts

Year-end charts

Release history

References

External links
 

2012 albums
Casablanca Records albums
Crystal Castles (band) albums
Fiction Records albums
Last Gang Records albums
Polydor Records albums
Universal Republic Records albums
Witch house (genre) albums
Sequel albums